Helen Fox (born 1962) is an English children's author, educated at Millfield School and New College, Oxford, where she read history and modern languages. Before becoming a full-time writer, Fox worked as a primary school teacher, a marketing executive, and a tour guide; she also trained and worked as an actress. 
Her Eager trilogy is about a self-aware robot in a futuristic society.

Works
Eager (2003)
Eager's Nephew (2004)
Eager and the Mermaid (2007)

External links

Reviews of Eager

References

English children's writers
Alumni of New College, Oxford
1962 births
Living people
People educated at Millfield